"Neon Church" is a song recorded by American country music artist Tim McGraw and written by Ben Goldsmith, Ben Stennis and Ross Ellis Lipsey. It was released on October 4, 2018 as his first single for Columbia Nashville, and was the intended first single from McGraw's forthcoming sixth studio album, though McGraw parted ways with the label before it was included on an album. It is included on the ultimate version of McGraw's fifteenth studio album Here on Earth.

Charts

Weekly charts

Year-end charts

References

2018 songs
2018 singles
Tim McGraw songs
Columbia Nashville Records singles
Songs written by Ben Stennis
Song recordings produced by Byron Gallimore
Song recordings produced by Tim McGraw